Clementine Meukeugni Noumbissi (born 1 October 1990) is a Cameroonian weightlifter. She competed in the women's 90 kg event at the 2018 Commonwealth Games, winning the bronze medal. She competed in the women's 87 kg event at the 2020 Summer Olympics held in Tokyo, Japan.

She competed in the women's 87 kg event at the 2022 Commonwealth Games held in Birmingham, England.

References

External links
 

1990 births
Living people
Sportspeople from Yaoundé
Cameroonian female weightlifters
Weightlifters at the 2014 Commonwealth Games
Weightlifters at the 2018 Commonwealth Games
Weightlifters at the 2022 Commonwealth Games
Commonwealth Games bronze medallists for Cameroon
Commonwealth Games medallists in weightlifting
Islamic Solidarity Games medalists in weightlifting
Islamic Solidarity Games competitors for Cameroon
Weightlifters at the 2020 Summer Olympics
Olympic weightlifters of Cameroon
African Games silver medalists for Cameroon
African Games medalists in weightlifting
Competitors at the 2019 African Games
21st-century Cameroonian women
Medallists at the 2018 Commonwealth Games